Phonetic Search Technology (PST) is a method of speech recognition.  An audio signal of speech is broken down into series of phonemes, which can be used to identify words.
A string of six phonemes for example, “_B _IY _T _UW _B _IY,” represent the acronym “B2B”.

References

Speech recognition